Norimichi (written:  or ) is a masculine Japanese given name. Notable people with the name include:

, Japanese kugyō
, Japanese footballer

Japanese masculine given names